Kaskazini is Swahili for "North". It is used in:

Kenya
 Kaskazini Mashariki, alternate name for Northeastern Province

Tanzania

Kigoma Region
 Mwanga Kaskazini, Kigoma-Ujiji District

Zanzibar North Region
 Kaskazini Unguja, alternate name for Zanzibar North Region
 Kaskazini A, a district
 Kaskazini B, a district

Kilimanjaro Region, Tanzania
 Mamba Kaskazini, a town and ward in Moshi Rural District
 Mwika Kaskazini, a town and ward in Moshi Rural District
 Siha Kaskazini, a town and ward in Hai District
 Machame Kaskazini, a town and ward in Hai District
 Kilema Kaskazini, a town and ward in Moshi Rural District
 Uru Kaskazini, a town and ward in Moshi Rural District

Pemba
 Kaskazini Pemba, alternate name for North Pemba Region